Frank Donlevy (born 16 December 1932) is a Scottish former footballer who played for Partick Thistle, St Johnstone and Berwick Rangers.

External links

1932 births
Living people
Scottish footballers
Footballers from Edinburgh
Association football wing halves
Hibernian F.C. players
Partick Thistle F.C. players
St Johnstone F.C. players
Berwick Rangers F.C. players
Scottish Football League players
Scottish expatriate footballers
Expatriate soccer players in Australia
Scottish expatriate sportspeople in Australia